Dead Man's Bones is a rock duo consisting of actor Ryan Gosling and Zach Shields. Their first album, Dead Man's Bones, was released on 6 October 2009 through ANTI- Records. The entire album is a collaboration with the Silverlake Conservatory Children's Choir — started by Red Hot Chili Peppers bassist Flea — from Los Angeles, California. Gosling performs under the alias "Baby Goose".

Background and development
When Shields and Gosling met in 2005 they discovered a mutual obsession with the Haunted Mansion ride at Disneyland. Zach was so preoccupied with ghosts as a kid that he was put into therapy, and Gosling's parents moved out of his childhood home because they believed it was haunted. Neither of them had really outgrown their fascination with graveyards or anything deathly and decided to write love stories about ghosts and monsters.

The pair chose to play all the instruments on the record, even those they had never touched before. They also imposed rules on themselves during the recording process, such as not playing with a click track, and trying to do no more than three takes on any song, letting any imperfections highlight the strengths of the music. On 25 December 2008, Dead Man's Bones released a music video and free download for their song "In the Room Where You Sleep", and on 4 April 2009, the band released another music video for their song "Name in Stone" on MySpace and YouTube. The self-titled debut album from the band featured members of the Silverlake Conservatory of Music's children's choir and was released on 6 October 2009 through ANTI- Records and was produced by Tim Anderson of Ima Robot. Gosling and Shields also toured around the United States for fall/Halloween 2009 with a local choir and talent show at every show to rave reviews. Each children's choir was similar to Silverlake Conservatory Children's Choir with whom they recorded the album. In 2010, they released two other music videos for tracks: "Dead Hearts" and "Pa Pa Power".

Gosling's use of a children's choir was cited as inspiration for blackened death metal band Behemoth to do the same on their 2018 album I Loved You At Your Darkest. They have also been cited as an influence on Our Time Down Here.

In the closing credits of the 2013 French film Age of Panic, the Dead Man's Bones song "Lose Your Soul" is featured. The song "In the Room Where You Sleep" was included in the soundtrack of the 2013 film The Conjuring.

Discography

"Intro"
"Dead Hearts"
"In the Room Where You Sleep"
"Buried in Water"
"My Body's a Zombie for You"
"Pa Pa Power"
"Young & Tragic"
"Paper Ships"
"Lose Your Soul"
"Werewolf Heart"
"Dead Man's Bones"
"Flowers Grow Out of My Grave"

Members 
 Ryan Gosling – vocals, piano, bass guitar, guitar, keyboards (2007–present)
 Zach Shields – vocals, percussion, drums, guitar (2007–present)

References

External links 
Video Premiere: Dead Man’s Bones’ Haunting “Dead Hearts” - Rolling Stone
Dead Man's Bones performing "Name In Stone" at a cemetery with L.A. Inner Mass Choir & the Silverlake Conservatory Children's Choir: Dead Man's Bones: Name In Stone on YouTube
 In The Room Where You Sleep (Wrap Party Live Video)
 Dead Man's Bones at Twitter
 Dead Man's Bones at Last.fm
 Dead Man's Bones at ANTI
 Ryan Gosling at the Internet Movie Database

Indie rock musical groups from California
Musical groups from Los Angeles
Musical groups established in 2007
American musical duos
Folk rock groups from California
Anti- (record label) artists